Howard Young How Wah (born 30 March 1948 in Hong Kong with family roots in Xinhui, Guangdong) was a member of the Legislative Council of Hong Kong (Functional constituencies, Tourism) and the member of Southern District Council. He is a member of Liberal Party. He works as a general manager in Cathay Pacific Airways.

In May 2008, his younger son, Jeremy Young Chit On, was appointed to be the political assistant for Food and Health by the Hong Kong SAR Government.

Honours
In 2003, Young was awarded the Silver Bauhinia Star by the Hong Kong SAR Government.

References 

1948 births
Living people
Cathay Pacific
Members of the National Committee of the Chinese People's Political Consultative Conference
District councillors of Southern District
Members of the Urban Council of Hong Kong
Liberal Party (Hong Kong) politicians
Liberal Democratic Federation of Hong Kong politicians
New Hong Kong Alliance politicians
Progressive Hong Kong Society politicians
District councillors of Sham Shui Po District
Members of the Provisional Legislative Council
HK LegCo Members 1991–1995
HK LegCo Members 1995–1997
HK LegCo Members 1998–2000
HK LegCo Members 2000–2004
HK LegCo Members 2004–2008
Members of the Preparatory Committee for the Hong Kong Special Administrative Region
Members of the Selection Committee of Hong Kong
Hong Kong Basic Law Consultative Committee members
Recipients of the Silver Bauhinia Star